Said Abdi Haibeh (born June 1971) is a Dutch-Somali football manager and football agent,

Managerial career
In December 2019, following the resignation of Bashir Hayford due to the Somali Civil War, Haibeh succeeded Hayford as manager of Somalia. In May 2021, Haibeh was replaced as manager of Somalia by Abdellatif Salef.

Personal life
Haibeh also works as a football agent.

References

Living people
Somalian football managers
Somalia national football team managers
Dutch people of Somali descent
Dutch sports agents
Association football agents
1971 births